Ambum Rural LLG is a local-level government (LLG) of Enga Province, Papua New Guinea.

Wards
01. Par
02. Lakapos
03. Yampu
04. Tialipos
05. Aiametes
06. Talemanda
07. Palimbi
08. Pandai
09. Kasi
10. Lakui
11. Lakamanda
12. Sikiro
13. Sikiro Catholic Mission
14. Anditale 1
15. Anditale 2
16. Omain
17. Monokam
18. Tongem
19. Kupin
20. Kanomares
21. Kambus
22. Londor
23. Elakale
24. Penei (Lailam)
25. Yarulama

References

Local-level governments of Enga Province